The 2001–02 season was the 103rd season of competitive league football in the history of English football club Wolverhampton Wanderers. They played the season in the second tier of the English football system, the Football League First Division.

The season proved a notable disappointment for the club after being denied promotion in the play-offs. The team had sat in the automatic promotion spots for the majority of the campaign, but a late slump in form saw local rivals West Bromwich Albion pip them to second place. Defeat to Norwich City in the semi-finals then ended their hopes of returning to the top flight for the first time since 1984.

The club had spent in excess of £11 million before and during the season to try to achieve promotion, in this, manager Dave Jones' first full season in charge.

Results

Pre season
Wolves' pre season saw them spend a week in Caldas da Rainha, Portugal (13–22 July), training and playing three Portuguese sides. This schedule was a change from their initial plans to compete in the Toronto Soccer Festival against both Canadian sides and other overseas entrants. However this event was cancelled two months beforehand.

Football League First Division

A total of 24 teams competed in the Football League First Division in the 2001–02 season. Each team played every other team twice: once at their stadium, and once at the opposition's. Three points were awarded to teams for each win, one point per draw, and none for defeats.

The provisional fixture list was released on 21 June 2001, but was subject to change in the event of matches being selected for television coverage or police concerns.

Final table

Source: Statto.com

Results summary

Results by round

Play-offs

FA Cup

League Cup

Players

Statistics

|-
|align="left"|||align="left"|||align="left"| 
|48||0||1||0||1||0||50||0||0||0||
|-
|align="left"|||align="left"|||align="left"| 
|37||0||1||0||0||0||38||0||4||1||
|-
|align="left"|||align="left"|||align="left"| 
|||0||0||0||0||0||||0||3||0||
|-
|align="left"|||align="left"|||align="left"| 
|||2||0||0||1||0||||2||1||0||
|-
|align="left"|||align="left"|||align="left"| 
|46||5||0||0||0||0||46||5||4||1||
|-
|align="left"|||align="left"|||align="left"| 
|45||1||1||0||1||0||47||1||8||1||
|-
|align="left"|||align="left"|FW||align="left"|  ¤
|||0||0||0||0||0||||0||1||0||
|-
|align="left"|||align="left"|||align="left"| 
|||0||0||0||0||0||||0||2||0||
|-
|align="left"|||align="left"|FW||align="left"|  ¤
|||3||0||0||1||0||||3||2||0||
|-
|align="left"|10||align="left"|FW||align="left"|  †
|||0||0||0||1||0||||0||0||0||
|-
|align="left"|10||align="left"|||align="left"| 
|||1||0||0||0||0||style="background:#98FB98"|||1||2||0||
|-
|align="left"|11||align="left"|||align="left"| 
|||5||1||0||1||0||style="background:#98FB98"|||5||2||0||
|-
|align="left"|12||align="left"|||  style="background:#faecc8; text-align:left;"|  ‡
|0||0||0||0||0||0||0||0||0||0||
|-
|align="left"|12||align="left"|||  style="background:#faecc8; text-align:left;"|  ‡
|0||0||0||0||0||0||0||0||0||0||
|-
|align="left"|13||align="left"|||  style="background:#faecc8; text-align:left;"|  ‡
|0||0||0||0||0||0||0||0||0||0||
|-
|align="left"|14||align="left"|FW||align="left"|  
|||1||0||0||0||0||||1||0||0||
|-
|align="left"|15||align="left"|FW||align="left"|  
|||2||||0||||0||||2||1||0||
|-
|align="left"|16||align="left"|||align="left"| 
|||1||0||0||||0||||1||1||0||
|-
|align="left"|17||align="left"|FW||align="left"|  ¤ †
|0||0||0||0||0||0||0||0||0||0||
|-
|align="left"|18||align="left"|||align="left"| 
|||0||0||0||1||0||||0||0||0||
|-
|align="left"|20||align="left"|||align="left"| 
|47||8||1||0||1||0||style="background:#98FB98"|49||8||8||0||
|-
|align="left"|21||align="left"|||align="left"| 
|||4||1||0||0||0||style="background:#98FB98"|||4||7||0||
|-
|align="left"|22||align="left"|FW||align="left"|  ¤ 
|0||0||0||0||0||0||0||0||0||0||
|-
|align="left"|23||align="left"|||align="left"| 
|||0||1||0||1||0||||0||0||0||
|-
|align="left"|24||align="left"|||align="left"|  ¤ †
|||0||0||0||1||1||||1||0||0||
|-
|align="left"|24||align="left"|||align="left"| 
|||7||1||0||0||0||style="background:#98FB98"|||7||10||0||
|-
|align="left"|25||align="left"|||align="left"| 
|||0||1||0||1||0||||0||7||0||
|-
|align="left"|26||align="left"|FW||  style="background:#faecc8; text-align:left;"|  ‡
|||2||||0||0||0||style="background:#98FB98"|||2||1||0||
|-
|align="left"|27||align="left"|FW||align="left"| 
|||11||1||0||0||0||style="background:#98FB98"|||11||7||0||
|-
|align="left"|28||align="left"|||align="left"|  ¤ †
|0||0||0||0||0||0||0||0||0||0||
|-
|align="left"|28||align="left"|||  style="background:#faecc8; text-align:left;"|  ‡
|0||0||0||0||0||0||0||0||0||0||
|-
|align="left"|29||align="left"|||align="left"|  †
|0||0||0||0||0||0||0||0||0||0||
|-
|align="left"|29||align="left"|FW||  style="background:#faecc8; text-align:left;"|  ‡
|29||21||1||0||0||0||style="background:#98FB98"|30||21||5||0||
|-
|align="left"|30||align="left"|||align="left"| 
|0||0||0||0||0||0||0||0||0||0||
|-
|align="left"|31||align="left"|||  style="background:#faecc8; text-align:left;"|  ‡
|||0||0||0||0||0||style="background:#98FB98"|||0||0||0||
|-
|align="left"|32||align="left"|||align="left"|  ¤ 
|0||0||0||0||0||0||0||0||0||0||
|-
|align="left"|41||align="left"|||align="left"| 
|0||0||0||0||0||0||0||0||0||0||
|}

Awards

Transfers

In

Out

Loans in

Loans out

Management and coaching staff

Kit
The season retained the home kit from the previous year; a darker "old gold" style shirt with black shorts. A new away kit, however, was launched: an all-silver design with blue trims; their previous light blue away kit became a third choice strip. All were manufactured by WWFC, the club's own label, and sponsored by Goodyear (for a twelfth and final year).

References

Wolverhampton Wanderers F.C. seasons
Wolverhampton Wanderers